Mardom is a Persian word meaning 'people'. It may refer to:
 Party of the Iranian People, an Iranian nationalist party
 People's Party (Iran), an Iranian royalist party also refereed to as Mardom in some English sources
 Mardom, the official newspaper of the Tudeh Party of Iran